Kim Il-sung Higher Party School (김일성고급당학교) – a key party-political educational institution in the DPRK responsible for training and preparing the managerial staff of the Workers' Party of Korea and the state apparatus that is part of the Central Committee of the Workers' Party of Korea.

It was founded on June 1, 1946, as the Central Party School of the Communist Party of North Korea based in Pyongyang, on the basis of the existing since November 1945 Kim Il-sung High School, who prepares political and educational officers and translators of the Russian language. On the sixtieth birthday of Kim Il-sun, in April 1972, his name was given to the university - the Kim Il-sung Higher Party School. A year later, in 1973, the university was integrated with the Marxist–Leninist School. Since 1978, it has been operating on the rights of the central educational institution.

The lecturers are recruited from the management staff of the Central Committee, the Academy of Sciences and the Kim Il-sung University.

References

 
Politics of North Korea
Education in Pyongyang
Universities in North Korea
1946 establishments in North Korea
Educational institutions established in 1946